Prunus grisea is a species of plant in the family Rosaceae. It is found in Malaysia, the Philippines, Singapore, and Taiwan.

It was published and described by Cornelis Kalkman in 'Blumea' vol.13 on page 56 in 1965.

References

 

grisea
Least concern plants
Taxonomy articles created by Polbot